Photon, in comics, may refer to:

Monica Rambeau, the female, former leader of the Avengers, also known as Captain Marvel
Genis-Vell, the son of Mar-Vell, also formerly known as Legacy and Captain Marvel
Photon, a member of Youngblood 
Jason Dean, the villain who murdered Nova's uncle Ralph Rider.

See also
Photon (disambiguation)